Liberals' Movement, abbreviated to LS, is a conservative-liberal political party in Lithuania.

History

Foundation, participation in the government and growth (2006–2016)

The party was founded in 2006 by dissident members of the Liberal and Centre Union that were unhappy with Artūras Zuokas's leadership.

In the summer of 2006, the Liberal Movement started cooperating with the Homeland Union (as the Liberal and Centre Union before joining Kirkilas Cabinet). In the 2007 municipal elections the party got 4.66 per cent of national vote.

In the legislative elections of 2008 it gained 11 seats in the Seimas and 5.72 percent of the national vote. The LRLS formed a coalition with the Homeland Union, the Liberal and Centre Union, and the National Resurrection Party. This coalition gained a combined governmental majority of 80 out of 141 seats in the Seimas, led by Prime Minister Andrius Kubilius of the Homeland Union. At the subsequent elections of 2012, the party lost one seat to finish with 10 seats in the Seimas and 8.57 percent of the national vote.

Just month before the 2011 municipal election, the party started to describe itself as "rational mind right-wingers", which amplified possibility to win over the Liberal and Centre Union and the Homeland Union. The party's support started to grow. In 2014 European Parliament election and 2015 municipal election the party got 16.55 and 15.49 per cent of the national vote respectively. This growth was mainly at expense of the Liberal and Centre Union and the Lithuanian Freedom Union (Liberals), which got 1.48 and per 4.91 cent of national vote 2014 and 2015 elections respectively. It was also attributed to the previously undecided voters or voters of other parties (the Homeland Union, the Order and Justice and Labour Party).

Corruption scandal, decline, internal disagreements and joining the government for the second time (since 2016)

After the party's leader Eligijus Masiulis allegedly took a bribe of 106,000 euros, Antanas Guoga temporarily took his position on May 13, 2016. He was the chairman for four days only before resigning. One month later, the mayor of Vilnius Remigijus Šimašius was elected as party's chairman.

The corruption case of Eligijus Masiulis is still ongoing. He claims that the money was a loan he received from a local businessman. The party has denied any connection to the seized money.

Šimašius leadership didn't last long and in 2017 Eugenijus Gentvilas was elected as a new leader.

In preparations for 2019 municipal elections, several districts' committees (most notably in Vilnius, Klaipėda and Varėna districts) decided to form public election committees. Liberal Movement board annulled districts' committees decisions. In return, districts' committees of Vilnius, Klaipėda and Varėna districts leaders (Aušrinė Armonaitė, Vytautas Grubliauskas and Algis Kašėta respectively) resigned from their positions or left the party altogether.

One of these public election committees, "For Vilnius, which we are proud of!", in summer of 2019 formed a basis for a new party, the Freedom Party. Aforementioned public election committees (alongside one in Elektrėnai) joined new party as well.

On the other hand, public election committee "For changes in Pagėgiai area" prior to the 2020 parliamentary election joined the Lithuanian Farmers and Greens Union, while the most of members of the Order and Justice (which dissolved itself in 2020) in the same area became members of the Liberal Movement.

In 2020 parliamentary election the managed to get seven per cent of votes. It later joined coalition with the Homeland Union and the Freedom Party. In 2022 the party changed its name (removed reference to the Republic of Lithuania) and logo.

Popular support
Main party support is coming from urban areas (notably, from Klaipėda). The party receives support from rural areas as well, but this support comes from suburbs of towns closer to the cities (e. g. Gargždai, Jurbarkas).

Election results

Seimas

Members of the European Parliament

Members of Seimas

Mayors

Vice-mayors

See also
 Liberalism in Lithuania
 Lithuanian Liberal Youth

References

External links
  Liberal Movement official website
  A. Guoga traukiasi iš Liberalų sąjūdžio

Centre-right parties in Europe
Classical liberal parties
Conservative liberal parties
Liberal parties in Lithuania
Alliance of Liberals and Democrats for Europe Party member parties
Political parties established in 2006
2006 establishments in Lithuania